Camerata Cornello is a comune (municipality) in the Province of Bergamo in the Italian region of Lombardy, located about  northeast of Milan and about  north of Bergamo.

Camerata Cornello borders the following municipalities: Cassiglio, Lenna, Piazza Brembana, San Giovanni Bianco, Taleggio.

People
The community was the original home of Omodeo Tasso, the late-13th Century founder of the Princely House of Thurn and Taxis. On 14 July 1914, Simone Pianetti shot seven local burghers and fled into the mountains.

References